Ludvík or Ludvik is a given name. Notable people with the name include:

Ludvík Aškenazy (1921–1986), Czech writer and journalist
Ludvik Buland (1893–1945), Norwegian trade unionist
Ludvík Čelanský (1870–1931), Czech conductor and composer
Ludvík Daněk (1937–1998), Czechoslovak discus thrower, who won gold in Athletics at the 1972 Summer Olympics
Ludvík Klíma (1912–1973), Czechoslovak sprint canoeist who competed in the late 1930s and late 1940s
Ludvík Kuba (1863–1956), Czech landscape painter, musician, writer, professor in the Academy of Fine Arts
Ludvík Kundera (1920–2010), Czech writer, translator, poet, playwright, editor and literary historian
Johan Ludvik Løvald (born 1943), Norwegian diplomat
Ludvík Podéšť (1921–1968), Czech composer, conductor, music journalist and editor
Ludvík Ráža (1929–2000), Czech film director
Ludvík Souček (1926–1978), probably the best-known author of science fiction in Czechoslovakia
Ludvík Svoboda (1895–1979), Czechoslovak general and politician
Ludvík Vébr (born 1960), Czech rower who competed for Czechoslovakia in the 1972 and 1976 Summer Olympics
Ludvík Vaculík (born 1926), Czech writer and journalist

See also
Martin Ludvik, young Czech fashion designer
Lodewijk

Czech masculine given names